Obereoides is a genus of longhorn beetles of the subfamily Lamiinae, containing the following species:

 Obereoides antennatus Martins & Galileo, 2003
 Obereoides cicatricosus (Zajciw, 1968)
 Obereoides joergenseni (Bruch, 1911)
 Obereoides parahybanus Galileo & Martins, 1998
 Obereoides setulosus (Aurivillius, 1920)

References

Forsteriini